Otto Yulyevich Shmidt (born Otto Friedrich Julius Schmidt;  – 7 September 1956), better known as Otto Schmidt, was a Soviet scientist, mathematician, astronomer, geophysicist, statesman, and academician.

Biography
He was born in the town of Mogilev in the Russian Empire, in what is now Belarus. His father was a descendant of German settlers in Courland, while his mother was a Latvian. In 1912-13 while in university he published a number of mathematical works on group theory which laid foundation for Krull–Schmidt theorem.

In 1913, Schmidt married Vera Yanitskaia and graduated from the Saint Vladimir Imperial University of Kiev, where he worked as a privat-docent starting from 1916. In 1918 he became a member of the Russian Social Democratic Labour Party (internationallists) which was later dissolved in to the Russian Communist Party (b). After the October Revolution of 1917, he was a board member at several People's Commissariats (narkomats)such as Narkomprod from 1918 to 1920 (Narodnyi Komissariat Prodovolstviya, or People's Commissariat for Supplies), People's Commissariat for Finance from 1921 to 1922 (Narodnyi Komissariat Finansov, or People's Commissariat for Finances). Schmidt was one of the chief proponents of developing the higher education system, publishing, and science in Soviet Russia.

He worked at Narkompros (People's Commissariat for Education), the State Scientific Board at the Council of People's Commissars of the USSR, and the Communist Academy. He was Chair of the Foreign Literature Committee from October 1921. Following the Litkens Commission Schmidt was also employed as the director of the State Publishing House (Gosizdat) from 1921 to 1924, and chief editor of the Great Soviet Encyclopedia from 1924 to 1941. From 1923 he was a professor at the Second Moscow State University and later at the Moscow State University, and from 1930 to 1932, Schmidt was the head of the Arctic Institute.

From 1932 to 1939, he was appointed head of Glavsevmorput' (Glavnoe upravlenie Severnogo Morskogo Puti) – an establishment that oversaw all commercial operations on the Northern Sea Route. From 1939 to 1942, Schmidt became a vice-president of the Soviet Academy of Sciences, where he organized the Institute of Theoretical Geophysics (he was its director until 1949). Otto Schmidt was a founder of the Moscow Algebra School, which he directed for many years.

In the mid-1940s, Schmidt suggested a new cosmogonical hypothesis on the formation of the Earth and other planets of the Solar System, which he continued to develop together with a group of Soviet scientists until his death.

Arctic
Schmidt was an explorer of the Arctic. In 1929 and 1930, he led expeditions on the steam icebreaker Georgy Sedov, establishing the first scientific research station on the Franz Josef Land, exploring the northwestern parts of the  Kara Sea and western coasts of Severnaya Zemlya, and discovering a few islands.

In 1932, Schmidt's expedition on the steam icebreaker Sibiryakov with Captain Vladimir Voronin made a non-stop voyage from Arkhangelsk to the Pacific Ocean without wintering for the first time in history.

From 1933 to 1934, Schmidt led the voyage of the steamship Cheliuskin, also with Captain Vladimir Voronin, along the Northern Sea Route. In 1937, he supervised an airborne expedition that established a drift-ice station "North Pole-1". In 1938, he was in charge of evacuating its personnel from the ice.

Otto Schmidt was a member of the Central Executive Committee of the USSR and a deputy of the Supreme Soviet of the USSR of the first convocation (1938 -1946).

Legacy

The authorities awarded Otto Schmidt three Orders of Lenin, three other orders and many medals. Schmidt Island in the Kara Sea, Cape Schmidt on the coastline of the Chukchi Sea in Chukotka Autonomous Okrug, as well as the Institute of Earth Physics at the Soviet Academy of Sciences, among other places, bear Schmidt's name.

A minor planet, 2108 Otto Schmidtdiscovered in 1948 by Soviet astronomer Pelageya Shajncommemorates him.

The icebreaker  originally bore the name Otto Yulyevich Schmidt.

Honours and awards
 Hero of the Soviet Union
 Order of Lenin, three times
 Order of the Red Banner of Labour, twice
 Order of the Red Star

See also
Chief Directorate of the Northern Sea Route
Frobenius group

Notes

References

Sources

Aleksey E. Levin, Stephen G. Brush The Origin of the Solar System: Soviet Research 1925–1991. AIP Press, 1995. 
Brontman, L.K. On top of the world: the Soviet expedition to the North pole, 1937–1938, New York, 1938.
 McCannon, John. Red Arctic: Polar Exploration and the Myth of the North in the Soviet Union, 1932–1939. New York: Oxford University Press, 1998.
 Otto Iul'evich Shmidt: Zhizn' i deiatel'nost'. Moscow: Nauka, 1959.

External links
 

1891 births
1956 deaths
People from Mogilev
People from Mogilyovsky Uyezd (Mogilev Governorate)
Communist Party of the Soviet Union members
First convocation members of the Soviet of Nationalities
Belarusian encyclopedists
Baltic-German people
Soviet polar explorers
Belarusian people of Latvian descent
Belarusian people of German descent
Belarusian explorers
Severnaya Zemlya
Soviet astronomers
Soviet mathematicians
Belarusian astronomers
20th-century Belarusian mathematicians
Soviet geophysicists
Franz Josef Land
Kara Sea
Laptev Sea
Chukchi Sea
East Siberian Sea
Taras Shevchenko National University of Kyiv alumni
Academic staff of Moscow State University
Academic staff of Moscow State Pedagogical University
Full Members of the USSR Academy of Sciences
Heroes of the Soviet Union
Recipients of the Order of Lenin